Charalampos "Charis" Mallios (born August 6, 1987) is a Greek handball player.

He played for the Greek club Panellinios Athens and moved from there to Diomidis Argous. In the 2012–2013 season he was under contract with the German third division team HF Springe until the early termination of his contract in January 2013. Then he returned to Diomidis. From the beginning of September 2014 he was under contract with the German third division Stralsunder HV. After the 2015–2016 season, Mallios left Stralsund HV. As Diomidis Argous player, he won the 2011–12 EHF Challenge Cup.

References

1987 births
Living people
Greek male handball players
Olympiacos H.C. players
Sportspeople from Athens
Mediterranean Games competitors for Greece
Competitors at the 2009 Mediterranean Games